Copper(I) chloride, commonly called cuprous chloride, is the lower chloride of copper, with the formula CuCl. The substance is a white solid sparingly soluble in water, but very soluble in concentrated hydrochloric acid. Impure samples appear green due to the presence of copper(II) chloride (CuCl2).

History
Copper(I) chloride was first prepared by Robert Boyle in the mid-seventeenth century from mercury(II) chloride ("Venetian sublimate") and copper metal:
HgCl2  +  2 Cu  →  2 CuCl  +  Hg

In 1799, J.L. Proust characterized the two different chlorides of copper.  He prepared CuCl by heating CuCl2 at red heat in the absence of air, causing it to lose half of its combined chlorine followed by removing residual CuCl2 by washing with water.

An acidic solution of CuCl was formerly used for analysis of carbon monoxide content in gases, for example in Hempel's gas apparatus.  This application was significant during the nineteenth and early twentieth centuries when coal gas was widely used for heating and lighting.

Synthesis
Copper(I) chloride is produced industrially by the direct combination of copper metal and chlorine at 450–900 °C:
2 Cu + Cl2 -> 2 CuCl
Copper(I) chloride can also be prepared by reducing copper(II) chloride with sulfur dioxide, or with ascorbic acid (vitamin C) that acts as a reducing sugar:
2 CuCl2 + SO2 + 2 H2O -> 2 CuCl + H2SO4 + 2 HCl
2 CuCl2 + C6H8O6 -> 2CuCl + 2HCl + C6H6O6
Many other reducing agents can be used.

Properties
Copper(I) chloride has the cubic zincblende crystal structure at ambient conditions. Upon heating to 408 °C the structure changes to hexagonal. Several other crystalline forms of CuCl appear at high pressures (several GPa).

Copper(I) chloride is a Lewis acid, which is classified as soft according to the Hard-Soft Acid-Base concept. Thus, it forms a series of complexes with soft Lewis bases such as triphenylphosphine:
 CuCl  + 1 P(C6H5)3  → 1/4  {CuCl[P(C6H5)3]}4
 CuCl  + 2 P(C6H5)3  →  CuCl[P(C6H5)3)]2
 CuCl  + 3 P(C6H5)3  →  CuCl[P(C6H5)3)]3

Although CuCl is insoluble in water, it dissolves in aqueous solutions containing suitable donor molecules.  It forms complexes with halide ions, for example forming H3O+ CuCl2− in concentrated hydrochloric acid.  Chloride is displaced by CN− and S2O32−.

Solutions of CuCl in HCl or NH3 absorb carbon monoxide to form colourless complexes such as the chloride-bridged dimer [CuCl(CO)]2.  The same hydrochloric acid solutions also react with acetylene gas to form [CuCl(C2H2)]. Ammoniacal solutions of CuCl react with acetylenes to form the explosive copper(I) acetylide, Cu2C2.  Alkene complexes of CuCl can be prepared by reduction of CuCl2 by sulfur dioxide in the presence of the alkene in alcohol solution.  Complexes with dienes such as 1,5-cyclooctadiene are particularly stable:

In absence of other ligands, its aqueous solutions are unstable with respect to disproportionation:
 2 CuCl  →  Cu +  CuCl2
In part for this reason samples in air assume a green coloration.

Uses
The main use of copper(I) chloride is as a precursor to the fungicide copper oxychloride. For this purpose aqueous copper(I) chloride is generated by comproportionation and then air-oxidized:
 Cu  +  CuCl2   →  2 CuCl
 4 CuCl  +  O2  + 2 H2O   →   Cu3Cl2(OH)4  +  CuCl2

Copper(I) chloride catalyzes a variety of organic reactions, as discussed above.  Its affinity for carbon monoxide in the presence of aluminium chloride is exploited in the COPureSM process.

In organic synthesis
CuCl is used with carbon monoxide, aluminium chloride, and hydrogen chloride in the Gatterman-Koch reaction to form benzaldehydes.

In the Sandmeyer reaction. Treatment of an arenediazonium salt with CuCl leads to an aryl chloride, for example:

The reaction has wide scope and usually gives good yields.

Early investigators observed that copper(I) halides catalyse 1,4-addition of Grignard reagents to alpha,beta-unsaturated ketones led to the development of organocuprate reagents that are widely used today in organic synthesis:

This finding led to the development of organocopper chemistry.  For example, CuCl reacts with methyllithium (CH3Li) to form "Gilman reagents" such as (CH3)2CuLi, which find extensive use in organic synthesis. Grignard reagents form similar organocopper compounds.  Although other copper(I) compounds such as copper(I) iodide are now more often used for these types of reactions, copper(I) chloride is still recommended in some cases:

Here, Bu indicates an n-butyl group.  Without CuCl, the Grignard reagent alone gives a mixture of 1,2- and 1,4-addition products (i.e., the butyl adds at the C closer to the C=O).

Copper(I) chloride is also an intermediate formed from copper(II) chloride in the Wacker process.

In polymer chemistry
CuCl is used as a catalyst in Atom Transfer Radical Polymerization (ATRP).

Niche uses
Copper(I) chloride is also used in pyrotechnics as a blue/green coloring agent. In a flame test, copper chlorides, like all copper compounds, emit green-blue.

Natural occurrence
Natural form of CuCl is the rare mineral nantokite.

References

External links

National Pollutant Inventory – Copper and compounds fact sheet
The COPureSM Process for purifying CO utilizing a copper chloride complex

Chlorides
Copper(I) compounds
Metal halides
Coordination complexes
Pyrotechnic colorants
Zincblende crystal structure